Shirakiopsis aubrevillei (syn. Sapium aubrevillei) is a species of flowering plant in the family Euphorbiaceae. It is native to Ivory Coast and Ghana, where it grows in wet forest habitat. It is threatened by habitat destruction from mining, logging, and tree plantations.

References

Hippomaneae
Flora of Ghana
Flora of Ivory Coast
Vulnerable flora of Africa
Taxonomy articles created by Polbot